The ARIA Award for Best Solo Artist, is an award first presented at the 2021 ARIA Music Awards as ARIA Award for Best Artist. It is handed out by the Australian Recording Industry Association (ARIA), an organisation whose aim is "to advance the interests of the Australian record industry." 

In 2021, the previous categories of ARIA Award for Best Male Artist and ARIA Award for Best Female Artist were combined to ensure that the ARIA Awards reflect and embrace equality and the true diversity of the music industry. In making this change the number of final nominees for Best Artist was ten.

The category was renamed to Best Solo Artist in 2022, still with ten final nominees.

Winners and nominees

References

External links
The ARIA Awards Official website

A